Charles Fergus Binns (4 October 1857 in Worcester – 4 December 1934 in Alfred, New York) was an English-born studio potter. Binns was the first director of the New York State School of Clayworking and Ceramics, currently called the New York State College of Ceramics at Alfred University. He began his position in 1900 and retired in 1931. His work included authorship of several books on the history and practice of pottery. Some of his more notable students included Arthur Eugene Baggs, William Victor Bragdon, R. Guy Cowan, Maija Grotell and Elizabeth Overbeck. This has led Binns to be called "the father of American studio ceramics".

Ceramic technique
Binns's ceramic technique focused on the vessel as a utilitarian object. His work include vases, urns, and bowls. Binns threw each piece in three forms on a wheel, turning them on a lathe and piecing them together afterwards. One of the concepts Binns taught was 'dead ground', in which aspects of making that could not be precisely controlled, such as firing temperature or glaze calculations, were mitigated by control over glaze placement - e.g., glaze was to run to a certain point but not to encroach on the foot.

Binns wrote of the artistic limitations of china-painting, which many amateur artists, mainly women, practiced at the time. He argued that “no-one with a spark of artistic fire can be content to copy the design of another or to merely add the finishing touches to work begun in a factory”, and that this feeling has caused china-painting to give place to pottery-making, in which, from “the consciousness of honest effort”, the artist experiences liberation. His book The Craft of the Potter (1910) may have given rise to the first use of the phrase “studio pottery”. In it Binns referred to "studio work" and the "artist potter", and a review of it in Adelaide Alsop Robineau's magazine Keramic Studio referred to “studio pottery”.

As a critic and influential educator in the ceramic field, his praise of utilitarian wares with artistic quality led the Arts and Craft Movement in American studio pottery.

Influence
Binns authored several books about ceramics. Among these was The Story of the Potter published by George Newnes in 1901, prior to his position at as director of the New York State School of Clayworking and Ceramics. He was an avid contributor to Keramic Studio.

Collections
Examples of Binns's work can be found in museums around the world, including:
 Alfred Ceramic Art Museum, Alfred University, Alfred, NY
 Art Institute of Chicago, IL
 Los Angeles County Museum of Art, CA
 Metropolitan Museum of Art, New York, NY
 Museum of Contemporary Craft, Portland, OR
 Museum of Fine Arts, Boston, MA
 National Museum of American History, Smithsonian Institution, Washington, DC

References

External links 
 Entry for Charles Fergus Binns on the Union List of Artist Names
 The Stonewares of Charles Fergus Binns: Father of American Studio Ceramic
 Books by Binns, now in the public domain:
The manual of practical potting. (1901)
  The potter's craft: a practical guide for the studio and workshop. (1910)
Etruscan terracotta warriors in the Metropolitan Museum of Art. Gisela M.A. Richter, with a report on structure and technique by Charles F. Binns. Papers (Metropolitan Museum of Art (New York, N.Y.)), no. 6 (1937).

1857 births
1935 deaths
Artists from Worcester, England
English ceramicists
English emigrants to the United States
People from Alfred, New York